P. K. Ramachandran Nair is an Indian American agricultural scientist,  Distinguished Professor of Agroforestry and International Forestry at the School of Forest Resources and Conservation, University of Florida. He is known for his pioneering contributions to the science of agroforestry, for which he received global recognition including the Humboldt Prize (2006). The specific areas of his research include: agroforestry in the tropics and subtropics, integrated farming systems, soil carbon sequestration and climate change mitigation, ecosystem services, and soil fertility management. He has written over 200 peer-reviewed articles, 17 books and over 75 book chapters.

Nair is a fellow of the American Association for the Advancement of Science, American Society of Agronomy, Crop Science Society of America, Soil Science Society of America, and the  National Academy of Agricultural Sciences, India,   He has been awarded honorary doctorate degrees from the University of Santiago de Compostela, Spain; University of Guelph, Canada; Kwame Nkrumah University of Science and Technology, Ghana; and Kyoto University, Japan.

Early life and education 
Nair was born and raised in Kerala, India. He received a B.Sc. in Agriculture in 1961 and an M.Sc. in Agronomy in 1968, both from Kerala University. He then received a Ph.D. in Agronomy from Pantnagar University in 1971. He worked as a post-doctoral fellow for a year at the Rothamsted Experimental Station in England and returned to India, joining the Plantation Crops Research Institute as an Agronomist. In 1976, he moved to Germany as a Senior Humboldt Fellow at   Goettingen University; there he received a Doctor of Science degree in Tropical Agriculture.

Career 
In 1978, Nair joined ICRAF, the World Agroforestry Centre,  a CGIAR Institution, which he co-founded, and moved to Nairobi, Kenya, and served as a principal scientist for about 10 years.  In 1987, he joined the University of Florida as professor, becoming Distinguished Professor in 2001. At the University of Florida, he initiated the Agroforestry Program.

From 1994 to 2005, Nair was the Editor-in-Chief of Agroforestry Systems. He has also served as the Chief Editor of the Agroecology and Land Use section of the journal Frontiers in Environmental Science as well as on the Editorial Boards of several journals. He created the book series, Advances in Agroforestry in 2004 and has served as its editor since.

Nair initiated the World Agroforestry Congress series and organized the first one in Florida in 2004. A plenary session at the fourth Congress (2019), in Montpellier, France, was dedicated to him, acknowledging his contributions to the field.

Research and work 
In the 1960s, Nair's work was focused on multiple cropping and soil fertility management in the tropics and subtropics. Since the early 1970s, working at the Plantation (tree) Crops Institute in India, he applied the principles of multiple cropping to tree-based systems and developed the multistory cropping system with tree crops, which would later become an example of the sustainable multistrata agroforestry systems of the tropics. He investigated the patterns of light profile and soil-resource utilization in sole stands (monocrop) of coconut plantations in comparison with intercropping systems, which contributed to the establishment of the scientific foundations of the emerging field of agroforestry. His publications during the early 1970s on multiple cropping, 'multi-storeyed cropping’, 'integral agroforestry’ and others, published in international agricultural research journals marked the beginning of his career-long contributions to the development of the subject. 

In the 1980s,   his research at ICRAF was focused on soil productivity under agroforestry systems. The major areas included decomposition patterns of the foliage from different multipurpose trees used in tropical agroforestry systems, dynamics of soil organic matter and nutrients, and crop-nutrient availability. This research was conducted in various tropical ecological regions  and resulted in numerous publications, including a book: Soil Productivity Aspects of Agroforestry. During the 1980s, Nair also spearheaded a global inventory of agroforestry systems, with financial support of the US-AID and collaboration of numerous institutions in Africa, Asia, and Latin America. The results were published in a book Agroforestry Systems in the Tropics (1989).

In 1993, Nair wrote the book, An Introduction to Agroforestry, as a college-level textbook in agroforestry. It has been translated into Spanish, Portuguese, Japanese, and Thai languages.

In the early 2000s, Nair started focusing his research on soil carbon sequestration in agroforestry systems as a strategy for climate-change mitigation, in collaboration with a group of colleagues from different continents. This focus continued into the 2010s. He and his group established the important role of deep-rooting trees in sequestering carbon in soil, thereby reducing the emission of carbon dioxide to the atmosphere. A major outcome of the effort was a scientific understanding of the variations in soil carbon sequestration in different soil types depending on the soil characteristics and development of land-use systems to exploit the potential for climate-change mitigation. The research has produced more than 20 journal articles, a book, and numerous conference presentations to international gatherings. In addition to carbon sequestration, Nair has also worked on other aspects of ecosystem services of agroforestry systems including biodiversity conservation, soil conservation, and water quality enhancement.    

Nair’s other professional contributions include  : Editor-in-Chief of Agroforestry Systems; Chief Editor of Agroecology and Land Use Systems (Frontiers in Environmental Sciences); Editor of the book series Advances in Agroforestry; Initiator and leader of the World Agroforestry Congress series, held once every five years, starting with the first in Florida in 2004.

Awards and honors 
2000 - International Agronomy Award, American Society of Agronomy
2001 - International Soil Science Award, Soil Science Society of America
2002 - Honorary Doctor of Science Degree, Kyoto University
2004 - International Crop Science Award, Crop Science Society of America
2004 - Barrington Moore Award, Society of American Foresters
2005 - Honorary Doctor of Science Degree, University of Science and Technology
2005 - IUFRO (International Union of Forest Research Organizations) Scientific Achievement Award
2005 - Fulbright Senior Specialist Award
2006 - Honorary Doctor of Science Degree, University of Guelph
2006 - Humboldt Prize
2007 - Medal for Global Leadership in Agroforestry, Agriculture University Gazipur, Bangladesh
2008 - Honorary Doctor of Science Degree, University of Santiago de Compostela
2010 - The Hind Rattan (Jewel of India) Award
2014 - 2015 - Fulbright–Nehru Distinguished Chair Award
2014 - Outstanding Research Award, Society of American Foresters

Publications

Books authored 
Intensive Multiple Cropping with Coconuts in India: Principles, Programmes and Prospects (1979)
Agroforestry Species – A Crop Sheets Manual (1980)
Soil Productivity Aspects of Agroforestry (1984)
An Introduction to Agroforestry (1993)
Scientific Writing and Communications in Agriculture and Natural Resources (2014)

Books edited 
Agroforestry:  A Decade of Development (1987)
Agroforestry Systems in the Tropics (1989)
Agroforestry Education and Training:  Present and Future - Proceedings of an International Workshop (1990)
Directions in Agroforestry: A Quick Appraisal (1993)
Directions in Tropical Agroforestry Research. (1998)
New Vistas in Agroforestry. A compendium for the 1st World Congress of Agroforestry (2004)
Tropical Homegardens: A Time-Tested Example of Sustainable Agroforestry.  Advances in Agroforestry (2006)
Carbon Sequestration in Agroforestry Systems (2011)
Agroforestry – The Future of Global Land Use (2012)
Book Series Advances in Agroforestry; 13 books have been published in the Series to-date (2020).

References 

Living people
Year of birth missing (living people)
University of Florida faculty
American people of Indian descent
Humboldt Research Award recipients
Fellows of the American Association for the Advancement of Science